Botryosporium is a genus of fungi belonging to the order Hypocreales, family unknown.

The genus has cosmopolitan distribution.

Species
As accepedted by GBIF:
 Botryosporium diffusum 
 Botryosporium elegans 
 Botryosporium erumpens 
 Botryosporium hamatum 
 Botryosporium hughesii 
 Botryosporium indicum 
 Botryosporium leucostachys 
 Botryosporium longibrachiatum 
 Botryosporium madrasense 
 Botryosporium magnum 
 Botryosporium palmicola 
 Botryosporium peristrophes 
 Botryosporium pulchellum 
 Botryosporium pulchrum 
 Botryosporium pyramidale 
 Botryosporium sholayarense

References

Fungi